Hogan Township may refer to:

Hogan Township, Franklin County, Arkansas
Hogan Township, Pope County, Arkansas
Hogan Township, Dearborn County, Indiana